Good Weird Feeling is the third studio album by Canadian rock band Odds.  The album spawned the hit singles "Truth Untold", "Eat My Brain", "Satisfied", "Mercy To Go" and " I Would Be Your Man". Music journalist Larry LeBlanc included the album in his list of Top 10 records of 1995, ranking it #5. The album was nominated for "Best Rock Album" at the 1996 Juno Awards.

Commercial performance
Good Weird Feeling is the most commercially successful album by Odds, being certified Platinum in Canada. By November 1996, the album had sold 130,000 units in Canada.

Track listing

 "Truth Untold" (3:54)
 "Smokescreen (Come and Get Me)" (3:46)
 "Radios of Heaven" (4:08)
 "I Would Be Your Man" (3:26)
 "Satisfied" (3:00)
 "Break the Bed" (5:13)
 "Oh Sorrow, Oh Shame" (4:29)
 "Eat My Brain" (4:25)
 "The Last Drink" (3:09)
 "Anybody Else But Me" (3:50)
 "Mercy to Go" (5:17)
 "Leave It There" (6:25)
 "We'll Talk" (4:16)

References

1995 albums
Odds (band) albums
Elektra Records albums